The Redfield School Historic District encompasses a Depression-era school complex at 101 School Street in Redfield, Arkansas. The property is owned and managed by the nonprofit Friends of Redfield School Historic District and was listed on the U.S. National Register of Historic Places in 2014.

History
The first school on this site was a log school built in 1882. Later, a frame school was built and then replaced in 1914 with a two-story brick school and it was torn down to build the Works Progress Administration school. The school, built in 1939 with funding from the WPA, was the only project of the New Deal in Redfield.

Buildings and sites
The main building of the Redfield School Historic District is an H-shaped single-story brick building, 15,000 sq ft, with a dormered gable roof. Additional buildings include a carriage house and well house dating to the 1910s. The district includes a 1958 mid-century modern gable-roofed cinder block school gymnasium, 10,391 sq ft, with all wood interior including Glulam wooden beams made in Magnolia, Arkansas. It also includes the athletic fields that lie adjacent to the school building.

See also 
 National Register of Historic Places listings in Jefferson County, Arkansas

References

Further reading

External links

 
 Redfield School Historic District at The Living New Deal

2014 establishments in Arkansas
Basketball venues in Arkansas
Carriage houses on the National Register of Historic Places
Community centers in Arkansas
Former school buildings in the United States
Historic districts on the National Register of Historic Places in Arkansas
National Register of Historic Places in Redfield, Arkansas
Protected areas established in 2014
Protected areas of Jefferson County, Arkansas
School buildings completed in 1939
School buildings on the National Register of Historic Places in Arkansas
Sports venues completed in 1958
Sports venues on the National Register of Historic Places in Arkansas
Transport infrastructure completed in the 1910s
Works Progress Administration in Arkansas
1939 establishments in Arkansas
Mid-century modern
Modernist architecture in Arkansas